John Francis Scully, Jr. (born August 2, 1958) is a former American college and professional football player who was a guard in the National Football League (NFL) for ten seasons during the 1980s and early 1990s.  Scully played college football for the University of Notre Dame, and earned All-American honors.  He played for the NFL's Atlanta Falcons for his entire pro career.

Early years
He was born in Huntington, New York.

College career
Scully attended the University of Notre Dame, where he played for the Notre Dame Fighting Irish football team from 1977 to 1980.  As a senior in 1980, he was a team captain and was recognized as a consensus first-team All-American as the team's center.  He is the writer of the popular Notre Dame anthem "Here Come the Irish."

Professional career
In his ten-year NFL career, he played in 112 games and started eighty-two of them.

In 1989, John played piano and sung Bruce Springsteen's Meeting Across The River, a rather obscure track off the Born To Run album,  in a Super Bowl XXIII NFL players Talent Showcase. The event was telecast live on national television prior to game (where San Francisco beat Cincinnati, 20-16).

1958 births
Living people
All-American college football players
American football offensive linemen
Atlanta Falcons players
Notre Dame Fighting Irish football players
Sportspeople from Joliet, Illinois
People from Huntington, New York